After the Party may refer to:

Books
After The Party, novel by Lisa Jewell 2010
After the Party, 2007 book by Andrew Feinstein about the South African Arms Deal

Music
After The Party, album by Paul Oxley's Unit 1983
After The Party, album by The Push Stars 1999  
After The Party, album by Caleb Sean 2010
After the Party (album), by The Menzingers 2017
"After the Party", song from How to Stuff a Wild Bikini 1965
"After the Party", song by John Schumann from Etched in Blue 1987 
"After the Party", song by Bishi from Nights at the Circus (album) 2007